Old Soldiers (2005) is a science fiction novel by American writer David Weber, a sequel to the  short story "With Your Shield" published in the anthology Bolo!, edited by the same writer.   It details the future of the two survivors of that battle as they try to keep alive a remnant of humanity, deliberately separated off and sent far away from the war that is consuming both sides completely.

References

External links 
 An excerpt of Old Soldiers is available for download or reading online at the Baen Free Library here. The whole novel can be found here.

Baen Books available as e-books
2005 American novels
Novels by David Weber
2005 science fiction novels
American science fiction novels